North Jackson is an unincorporated community in central Jackson Township, Mahoning County, Ohio, United States. It lies along State Route 45 between Salem and Warren. It is part of the Youngstown–Warren metropolitan area. North Jackson is the site of a Marian shrine of the Catholic Church, the Basilica and National Shrine of Our Lady of Lebanon.

History
A post office called North Jackson has been in operation since 1837, with the ZIP code 44451. Besides the post office, North Jackson had a station on the Pennsylvania Railroad. A variant name was Jackson Center.

Education
Children in North Jackson are served by the Jackson-Milton Local School District. The current schools serving North Jackson are:
Jackson-Milton Elementary School – grades K-5
Jackson-Milton Middle School – grades 6-8
Jackson-Milton High School – grades 9-12

North Jackson has a public library, a branch of the Public Library of Youngstown and Mahoning County.

External links
 Township website
 County website

References

Unincorporated communities in Mahoning County, Ohio
1837 establishments in Ohio
Populated places established in 1837
Unincorporated communities in Ohio